The dorsal carpal branch of the ulnar artery arises from the ulnar artery immediately above the pisiform bone, and winds backward beneath the tendon of the flexor carpi ulnaris; it passes across the dorsal surface of the carpus beneath the extensor tendons, to anastomose with a corresponding branch of the radial artery.

Immediately after its origin, it gives off a small branch, which runs along the ulnar side of the fifth metacarpal bone, and supplies the ulnar side of the dorsal surface of the little finger.

References

External links
  - "Dorsum of the hand, deep dissection, posterior view"

Arteries of the upper limb